Overhaul is the process of searching for hidden fire extension on a fire scene. It is used in conjunction with salvage operations to reduce loss cause by fire. Overhaul is one of the last steps in the firefighting process.

References

Firefighting